St. Philip Neri Parish Historic District is a historic Roman Catholic church complex and national historic district located at Indianapolis, Indiana.  The district encompasses five contributing buildings: the church, rectory, former convent and school, school, and boiler house / garage.  The church was built in 1909, and is a Romanesque Revival brick church with limestone trim.  It features two- and three-story crenellated corner towers, a rose window with flanking round arched windows, and Doric order columns flanking the main entrance.

It was listed on the National Register of Historic Places in 1996.

References

Historic districts on the National Register of Historic Places in Indiana
Churches on the National Register of Historic Places in Indiana
Romanesque Revival architecture in Indiana
Neoclassical architecture in Indiana
Churches completed in 1909
Historic districts in Indianapolis
National Register of Historic Places in Indianapolis
Roman Catholic churches in Indianapolis
1909 establishments in Indiana